Htay Saung (born 13 November 1944) is a Burmese dental professor who served as Rector of the University of Dental Medicine, Yangon from 1993 to 1995.

Early life and education
Htay Saung was born in Rangoon, Myanmar on 13 November 1944. He graduated from University of Medicine 1, Yangon in July, 1970. He received Ph.D from Moscow in 1981.

See also
 Myanmar Dental Association
 Myanmar Dental Council
 University of Dental Medicine, Mandalay
 University of Dental Medicine, Yangon

References

1944 births
Living people
Burmese academic administrators
Burmese dental professors
People from Yangon
University of Medicine 1, Yangon alumni